Madhavi Krishnan is a British chemist who is an Associate Professor of Physical Chemistry at the University of Oxford. Krishnan invented an electrostatic fluidic trap which permits the spatial control and manipulation of nanoscale materials. These traps can permit the sensitive detection of biomarkers of disease, allowing for early diagnosis.

Early life and education 
Krishnan earned her undergraduate degree at Anna University in Chennai. She moved to the United States for her graduate studies, where she joined the University of Michigan at Ann Arbor to work on genetic testing.  Krishnan was an Alexander von Humboldt Foundation Fellow at TU Dresden, where she developed new techniques to trap colloidal nanoparticles and stretch DNA. In 2008 she was awarded a Marie Curie Fellowship and moved to ETH Zurich. She was a visiting scholar at the Harvard John A. Paulson School of Engineering and Applied Sciences.

Research and career 
In 2012 Krishnan was appointed an Assistant Professor of Physical Chemistry at ETH Zurich, where she was eventually made a Swiss National Science Foundation Chair. She moved to the University of Oxford in 2018, where she was made an Associate Professor of Physical Chemistry.

Krishnan investigates single-molecule imaging, making use of electrostatic fluid traps to suspend nanoscale materials. Traditionally, molecular traps need external fields (for example, ion traps and optical tweezers), which can perturb the systems that are under investigation. Investigating molecules in a field-free, electrostatic trap permits the non-destructive analysis of molecules in fluids at room temperature. Studying molecules in this way allows for unparalleled opportunity to understand molecular size and charge.

Awards and honours 
 2016 German Bunsen Society for Physical Chemistry Nernst-Haber-Bodensteinpreis 
 2018 European Research Council Consolidator Grant
 2020 Corday–Morgan Prize

Selected publications

References 

Living people
Year of birth missing (living people)
Anna University alumni
University of Michigan alumni
Fellows of Merton College, Oxford
21st-century British chemists
British people of Indian descent
21st-century British inventors
Academic staff of ETH Zurich
Indian women molecular biologists